Elizabeth Stuckey-French is an American short story writer, novelist and professor.

Life
Stuckey-French was born on September 2, 1958, in Little Rock. She grew up in the town of Lafayette, IN.

She graduated from Purdue University and was founding editor of the Sycamore Review. She was a James A. Michener Fellow at the Iowa Writers Workshop; she graduated with an MFA in 1992. Her stories have appeared in The Atlantic Monthly, The Gettysburg Review, The Southern Review, Five Points, Narr ative. She teaches creative writing at Florida State University. Richard Russo in his commentary about the selections in the 2005 O. Henry anthology, called Stuckey-French's "Mudlavia", "the one that burrowed deepest under my skin". He praised the "simplicity of its storytelling; the way its private and public stories play off each other; its fond, gentle humor; the heartbreaking, hard-won wisdom of its narrator."

She lived in Tallahassee, Florida with her husband Ned Stuckey-French and her two daughters, Phoebe and Flannery. Ned died of cancer in June 2019.

Awards
 2005 O. Henry Award for the story "Mudlavia", cited by juror Richard Russo
 2004–2005 Howard Foundation grant
 Indiana Arts Foundation grant
 Florida Arts Foundation grant

Works

Short stories
"Junior," The Atlantic, April 1996
"Electric Wizard," The Atlantic, June  1998
"Mudlavia," The Atlantic, September 2003

Novels
 
 Mudlavia, Doubleday
 The Revenge of the Radioactive Lady, Doubleday, 2011
 Where Wicked Starts, 2014

Anthologies

Non-fiction

References

External links

"Wise Kids, Childish Adults: A conversation with Elizabeth Stuckey-French", The Nation, June 11, 1998 
"Aimee Bender and Elizabeth Stuckey-French", Beatrice Interview

1958 births
Living people
Purdue University alumni
Iowa Writers' Workshop alumni
American short story writers
Florida State University faculty
O. Henry Award winners